The Nonviolent Action Group (NAG) was a student-run campus organization at Howard University that campaigned against racial segregation and other civil rights causes in the areas of Virginia, Maryland and Washington D.C.  during the 1960s

Civil Rights Movement activist Stokely Carmichael was a member of NAG while a student at Howard.

References 

Student societies in the United States
Civil rights organizations in the United States
Student political organizations in the United States